Nuts + Bolts  (pronounced Nuts and Bolts) is an  American television documentary series hosted by Tyler, The Creator. The series premiered on August 3, 2017 on Viceland and focuses on the rapper's interests and how things work.

Series overview

Episodes

Season 1 (2017)

References

External links
Official site

2017 American television series debuts
2010s American documentary television series
English-language television shows
Odd Future